Bormes-les-Mimosas is a commune in the Var department, Provence-Alpes-Côte d'Azur Region, southeastern France.

It has a Mediterranean climate.

Bormes-les-Mimosas is a city in bloom and won the 2003 Gold Medal awarded by the Entente Florale. The Fort de Brégançon, located in the commune, is the official retreat for the President of the French Republic.

The historic village is situated on the hills. Medieval houses are overgrown with bougainvillea flowers. Significant buildings include the church and the town hall.

Other parts of town include the seaside district of La Faviere with its marina.

Geography

Climate

Bormes-les-Mimosas has a hot-summer Mediterranean climate (Köppen climate classification Csa).

Demography

Personalities
Notable people related to Bormes-les-Mimosas include:
 Alfred Courmes, born in Bormes-les-Mimosas on 21 May 1898, painter
 Hermann Sabran, lawyer and philanthropist from Lyon, General Councillor of Var, owner of the Fort de Brégançon, married in Bormes-les-Mimosas on 22 June 1869
 Grand Duke Henri of Luxembourg (and the Grand Ducal Family), who owns a holiday villa in nearby Cabasson, purchased by his grandmother, the Grand Duchess Charlotte, in 1949.
 Hippolyte de Bouchard was born in Bormes-les-Mimosas on 15 January 1780. He was a sailor and corsair who fought for the independence of Argentina, Chile and Peru.

Points of interest
 Place St-Francois
 La chapelle Notre-Dame-de-Constance  
 Église St-Trophyme
 La chapelle Notre-Dame-de-Constance 
 Château des Seigneurs de Foz
 Musee "Arts et Histoire"
 Arboretum de Gratteloup
 Arboretum du Ruscas

Gallery

See also

Communes of the Var department

References

External links

City of Bormes-les-Mimosas official web site (in French)
Pictures of the city, the annual flower parade, and of the surrounding landscapes
More pictures of the city
Aerial map of the city
Information : Bormes les Mimosas and le Lavandou 

Communes of Var (department)